France (FRA) competed at the 2005 Mediterranean Games in Almería, Spain with a total number of 368 participants (213 men and 155 women).

Medals

Gold
 Boxing
Men's Bantamweight (– 54 kg): Ali Hallab
Men's Light Welterweight (– 64 kg): Alexis Vastine

 Judo
Men's Half-Heavyweight (– 100 kg): Ghislain Lemaire
Women's Half-Lightweight (– 52 kg): Annabelle Euranie
Women's Half-Middleweight (– 63 kg): Lucie Décosse

 Rowing
Men's Lightweight Single Sculls: Fabrice Moreau
Men's Lightweight Coxless Pairs: Jean-Christophe Bette and Franck Solforosi

 Swimming
Men's 1500m Freestyle: Sébastien Rouault
Men's 100m Breaststroke: Hugues Duboscq
Men's 200m Breaststroke: Hugues Duboscq
Men's 50m Butterfly: Frédérick Bousquet
Men's  Freestyle: Alain Bernard, Amaury Leveaux, Romain Barnier, and Frédérick Bousquet
Women's 100m Freestyle: Céline Couderc
Women's 200m Freestyle: Solenne Figuès
Women's 400m Freestyle: Laure Manaudou
Women's 50m Backstroke: Laure Manaudou
Women's 100m Backstroke: Alexandra Putra
Women's 100m Breastkstroke: Anne-Sophie Le Paranthoën
Women's  Freestyle: Elsa N'Guessan, Angela Tavernier, Sophie Huber, and Céline Couderc
Women's  Freestyle: Céline Couderc, Angela Tavernier, Elsa N'Guessan, and Solenne Figuès
Women's  Medley: Alexandra Putra, Anne-Sophie Le Paranthoën, Aurore Mongel, and Céline Couderc

Silver
 Boxing
Men's Welterweight (– 69 kg): Xavier Noel
Men's Super Heavyweight (+ 91 kg): Mohamed Samoudi

 Judo
Women's Half-Heavyweight (– 78 kg): Stéphanie Possamaï

 Rowing
Men's Lightweight Double Sculls: Frédéric Dufour and Arnaud Pornin
Women's Single Sculls: Caroline Delas

 Swimming
Men's 800m Freestyle: Sébastien Rouault
Men's 400m Medley: Nicolas Rostoucher
Women's 50m Freestyle: Céline Couderc
Women's 100m Freestyle: Solenne Figuès
Women's 200m Backstroke: Esther Baron
Women's 200m Medley: Cylia Vabre

Bronze
 Boxing
Men's Middleweight (– 75 kg): Mamadou Diambang
Men's Heavyweight (– 91 kg): Newfel Ouatah

 Judo
Men's Lightweight (– 73 kg): Anthony Fritsch
Women's Lightweight (– 57 kg): Fanny Riaboff

 Swimming
Men's 200m Freestyle: Amaury Leveaux
Men's 400m Freestyle: Sébastien Rouault
Men's 100m Butterfly: Romain Barnier
Men's  Freestyle: Matthieu Madelaine, Amaury Leveaux, Guillaume Strohmeyer, and Nicolas Rostoucher
Women's 800m Freestyle: Sophie Huber
Women's 200m Backstroke: Alexandra Putra

Results by event

Boxing
Men's Flyweight (– 51 kg)
 Jérôme Thomas
Men's Bantamweight (– 54 kg)
 Ali Hallab
Men's Featherweight (– 57 kg)
 Khedafi Djelkhir
Men's Lightweight (– 60 kg)
 Boubacar Dangnoko
Men's Light Welterweight (– 64 kg)
 Alexis Vastine
Men's Welterweight (– 69 kg)
 Xavier Noel
Men's Middleweight (– 75 kg)
 Mamamoud Diambang
Men's Light Heavyweight (– 81 kg)
 John Dovi
Men's Heavyweight (– 91 kg)
 Newfel Ouatah
Men's Super Heavyweight (+ 91 kg)
 Mohamed Samoudi

Volleyball

Men's Team Competition
Team Roster
Bertrand Carletti
Andy Ces
Vincent Duhagon
Jean-François Exiga  
Gary Gendrey 
Xavier Kapfer  
Florian Kilama  
Olivier Lamoise 
Yann Lavallez  
Marien Moreau 
Jean-François Perez 
Gael Vandaele

Women's Team Competition
Team Roster
Anne Andrieux
Corinne Cardassay   
Coralie Larnack  
Severine Lienard  
Jenifer Marechal 
Alexandra Rochelle
Anna Rybaczewski 
Pauline Soullard  
Audrey Syren  
Leslie Turiaf  
Stéphanie Volle

Water Polo
Team Roster
Andres Aguilar 
Marc Amardeilh   
Brice Boust  
Benoit Bry  
Alexandre Chevalier  
Quentin Chipotel  
Yann Clay  
Aurelien Cousin  
Remi Garsau  
Mathieu Peisson  
Thibaut Simon  
Yann Vergeade  
Yann Vernoux

See also
 France at the 2004 Summer Olympics
 France at the 2008 Summer Olympics

References
 Official Site
 juegosmediterraneos

Nations at the 2005 Mediterranean Games
2005
Mediterranean Games